Hard Cases is a British television crime drama series, based upon a 1987 novel by John Harvey and Laurence James, that aired on ITV between 18 January 1988 and 29 August 1989. Based around a group of officers from the crime probation service in Nottingham, the cast was initially led by John Bowe, supported by Gil Brailey, Eric Deacon and Barry Jackson. The series was one of the first British seasonal dramas to feature multiple lead characters and multiple, entwined stories, rather than reading an individual story in each episode.

The series notably featured Jimmy McGovern and Patrick Harbinson as its script editors, both of whom went on to have very successful careers as lead writers. Graham Nicolls, a then-serving officer in the Nottingham CPS, acted as an advisor. The series was accompanied by its own theme, written and performed by Tom Robinson, which was issued as a single by Robinson in 1988. Notably, neither series has been repeated since broadcast, nor is available on any form of home media.

Cast
 John Bowe as Martin Berry (Series 1)
 Gil Brailey as Gill Ridgeley (Series 1―2)
 Eric Deacon as Ross Kennedy (Series 1―2)
 Gaby Dellal as Leonie Friedman (Series 1)
 Barry Jackson as Jack Seymore (Series 1―2)
 Gerrard McArthur as Kevin Nash (Series 1―2)
 June Barrie as Hilary Bowen (Series 1―2)
 Denica Fairman as Chrissie Taylor (Series 2)
 Kevin McNally as Richard Pearce (Series 2)
 Sheila Ruskin as Lucy Davenport (Series 2)
 Valerie Hunkins as Charlotte Poole (Series 2)
 Sean Pertwee as Dominic Lutovski (Series 2)
 Ian Kirkby as Peter Collinson (Series 1)
 Brian Poyser as Cllr. Collinson (Series 1)
 Emma Bowe as Claire Sanderson (Series 2)

Episodes

Series 1 (1988)

Series 2 (1989)

References

Bibliography
 Rob C. Mawby & Anne Worrall. Doing Probation Work: Identity in a Criminal Justice Occupation. Routledge, 2013.

External links
 

1988 British television series debuts
1989 British television series endings
1980s British drama television series
ITV television dramas
Television series by ITV Studios
Television shows produced by Central Independent Television
Television shows set in Nottinghamshire
English-language television shows